The Monastery of Saint Jovan Bigorski is a Macedonian Orthodox monastery located in the western part of North Macedonia, near the road connecting the towns of Debar and Gostivar.

The monastery church is dedicated to St. John the Baptist.  One of its most valuable treasures is the iconostasis, created by Petre Filipov - Garkata from the nearby village of Gari, and considered one of the finest examples of wood-carved iconostases.

History
According to its 1833 chronicle, the monastery was built in 1020 by the Bulgarian clergyman John of Debar who was the last Patriarch of Bulgaria before the fall of the First Bulgarian Empire. The Ottomans destroyed the monastery in the 16th century, but it was restored in 1743 by the monk Ilarion, who also constructed a number of cells for monks.  The archimandrite Arsenius further expanded the monastery between 1812 and 1825. The historical record also mentions a monk Iov, recognized by some researchers as the future educator Yoakim Karchovski, a Bulgarian priest who became an important figure in the Bulgarian National Revival.

Most of the old monastery complex was destroyed by a fire in 2009, while the new sections of the complex and church were saved. Reconstruction of the old sections began in May 2010 with the goal of restoring the buildings as closely as possible to their original style.

Holy Relics
The monastery has a large collection of holy relics including John the Baptist, Clement of Ohrid, Lazarus of Bethany, Saint Stephen, Saint Nicholas, Saint Barbara, Paraskevi of Rome, Tryphon, Respicius, and Nympha, and part of the Holy Cross.

Another valuable monastery treasure is an icon dating from 1020 with supposedly miraculous healing power.

Gallery

References

External links 
 The official website of the monastery in English
St. John Bigorski
gostivar.com

Christian monasteries established in the 11th century
Macedonian Orthodox monasteries
Eastern Orthodox monasteries in North Macedonia
Mavrovo and Rostuša Municipality
Archbishopric of Ohrid